Ogygiocarella Brongniart, 1822, is a genus of asaphid trilobites. It occurred during the Middle Ordovician.

Etymology 
The generic name, Ogygiocarella, refers to "Ogygia", the seventh daughter of Amphion and Niobe, which name is combined with "-care-", from the Greek "akares", meaning short, and finally "-ella", the diminutive form.

History 
Ogygiocarella is arguably the first trilobite that was scientifically described. Rev. Edward Lhwyd published in 1698 in The Philosophical Transactions of the Royal Society, the oldest scientific journal in the English language, part of his letter “Concerning Several Regularly Figured Stones Lately Found by Him", that was accompanied by a page of etchings of fossils. One of his etchings figured a trilobite he found near Llandeilo, probably on the grounds of Lord Dynefor's castle, he described as “… the skeleton of some flat Fish …".

Distribution 
 O. debuchii occurs in the Middle Ordovician of Wales (late Llanvirn, Lampeter Velfrey, Abereiddi Bay).
 undetermined Ogygiocarella specimens have been found in the Middle Ordovician of Wales (early to late Llandeilo, Llandeilo Sandstone-siltstone facies, Llandeilo; Pencerrig Lake, near Builth Wells, Powys).

Description 
Ogygiocarella has a very flat calcified dorsal exoskeleton, with an oval outline (about 1½× longer than wide). The headshield (or cephalon) is 2½× wider than long, and of equal size as the tailshield  (or pygidium), a state called isopygeous. Both are semicircular. The backcorners of the cephalon end in so-called genal spines that stick backwards approximately to the 6th thorax segment. The central raised area of the cephalon (or glabella) has 4 pairs of furrows and expands in front of the eyes. The eyes are small, close to the glabella and in the rear half of the cephalon. The dorsal facial sutures, that split when moulding, arch from the front of the eye and pass in front of the glabella. The suture follows the top of the visual surface, as in all trilobites, and from there cut backwards and outwards at approximately 45° to reach the posterior margin of the cephalon approximately halfway between the glabella and the lateral border. As usual for members of the family Asaphidae, it has 8 articulating segments in the middle part of the body (or thorax). The axis is about half as wide as the ribs (or pleurae) to each of the sides. In the thorax the axis tapers slightly towards the back. In the pygidium the axis tapers stronger and terminates a short distance from the margin in a roundish endpiece. It has 10-14 ribs on each side of the axis, which fade-out in the border that is as wide as the axis.

References

External links
 

Asaphidae
Asaphida genera
Fossils of Wales
Ordovician trilobites
Paleontology in Wales